The Gilded Age is an American historical drama television series created and written by Julian Fellowes for HBO that is set in the United States during the Gilded Age, the boom years of the 1880s in New York City. Originally announced in 2018 for NBC, it was later announced in May 2019 that the show was moved to HBO. The series premiered on January 24, 2022. In February 2022, the series was renewed for a second season. It has received mostly positive reviews, with particular praise for the costumes, cast and performances of lead actors Carrie Coon, Morgan Spector and Christine Baranski.

Premise
A young woman entering 1882 New York City's rigid social scene is drawn into the daily conflicts surrounding the new money Russell family and the established van Rhijn-Brook family, who are neighbors across 61st Street near Fifth Avenue on the Upper East Side of Manhattan. The series also shows conflicts faced by the upper and upper middle classes, the Black upper class, and the domestic workers that tend to all of their needs.

Cast and characters

Main
 Carrie Coon as Bertha Russell, determined to use her money and position to break into a polite society that resists change at every turn
 Morgan Spector as George Russell, Bertha's husband and a classic robber baron representing "new money"
 Louisa Jacobson as Marian Brook, penniless young gentlewoman whose circumstances force her to live with her estranged aunts
 Denée Benton as Peggy Scott, a young ambitious African-American writer who works as Agnes' secretary
 Taissa Farmiga as Gladys Russell, innocent and naïve, yet ready to be treated as an adult
 Harry Richardson as Larry Russell, a recent Harvard University graduate eager to make his way in the world
 Blake Ritson as Oscar van Rhijn, Agnes' intelligent and charismatic son who is looking for a rich heiress to guarantee him a proper standard of living and act as a shield for his homosexuality.
 Thomas Cocquerel as Tom Raikes (season 1), a sensible young lawyer, smitten when he meets Marian, his late client's orphaned daughter
 Simon Jones as Mr. Bannister, the Van Rhijns' self-aggrandizing English butler who keeps the rest of the staff in check
 Jack Gilpin as Mr. Church, the Russell family's butler, a supporter of Mrs. Russell, excelling at his job
 Cynthia Nixon as Ada Brook, Agnes' sister who is reliant upon her charity
 Christine Baranski as Agnes van Rhijn (née Brook), a proud and stubborn old money socialite, head of the Brook house
 Kelli O'Hara as Aurora Fane (season 2; recurring season 1), Agnes' niece by marriage who helps Mrs. Russell break into society
 Donna Murphy as Caroline Schermerhorn Astor (season 2; recurring season 1), a prominent American socialite and leader of the elite group of New York society known as "The Four Hundred"
 Debra Monk as Mrs. Armstrong (season 2; recurring season 1), Mrs. Van Rhijn's lady's maid
 Kristine Nielsen as Mrs. Bauer (season 2; recurring season 1), cook for Mrs. Van Rhijn, taking young Bridget under her wing
 Taylor Richardson as Bridget (season 2; recurring season 1), the Van Rhijn housemaid, troubled by an abusive past
 Ben Ahlers as John "Jack" Treacher (season 2; recurring season 1), footman of the Van Rhijn household
 Kelley Curran as Miss Turner (season 2; recurring season 1), Bertha's ambitious lady's maid, who does not intend to be a servant all her days. She is fired at the end of season 1.
 Douglas Sills as Monsieur Baudin (season 2; recurring season 1), the chef of the Russell household who initially presents himself as French before it is revealed that he is Josh Borden from Wichita, Kansas.
 Celia Keenan-Bolger as Mrs. Bruce (season 2; recurring season 1), the Russell's new housekeeper
 Michael Cerveris as Mr. Watson (season 2; recurring season 1), George Russell's valet
 Erin Wilhelmi as Adelheid (season 2; recurring season 1), Gladys Russell's lady's maid
 Patrick Page as Richard Clay (season 2; recurring season 1), George Russell's loyal secretary
 Sullivan Jones as T. Thomas Fortune (season 2; recurring season 1), publisher of the weekly New York Globe

Recurring
 Audra McDonald as Dorothy Scott, Peggy's mother
 Jeanne Tripplehorn as Sylvia Chamberlain, a socialite excluded from high society due to past actions
 Ashlie Atkinson as Mamie Fish, American socialite and self-styled "fun-maker"
 Claybourne Elder as John Adams, Oscar's secret lover
 Katie Finneran as Anne Morris, determined to keep new money out of her circle
 Amy Forsyth as Carrie Astor, the comely daughter of Mrs. Astor
 John Sanders as Stanford White, an up and coming American architect
 John Douglas Thompson as Arthur Scott, Peggy's father. As a well-to-do pharmacist, he is a pillar of the Black elite
 Linda Emond as Clara Barton
 Ward Horton as Charles Fane, Aurora's husband and one of the city's aldermen
 Zuzanna Szadkowski as Mabel Ainsley
 Nathan Lane as Ward McAllister, arbiter of social rules and style in old New York

Guest
 Bill Irwin as Cornelius Eckhard
 Michel Gill as Patrick Morris, Anne's husband and one of the city's aldermen
 Tom Blyth as Archie Baldwin
 Andrew Child as Doylestown Farmer

Episodes

Production

Development
In September 2012, The Daily Telegraph reported Julian Fellowes as saying that he was working on a spin-off prequel of Downton Abbey. Initially conceived as a book, it was then planned for pick-up by ITV. At the time, Fellowes planned to focus the show around Lord Grantham and Cora's romance and eventual marriage as the Earl and Countess of Grantham.

Production and writing for The Gilded Age was updated in January 2016. Asked whether he'd written the script yet, Fellowes said, 'No I haven't, no. I'm doing that this year', before adding: 'And then hopefully shooting at the end of the year.'"

On June 4, 2016, Fellowes was asked by the Los Angeles Times, "Where does The Gilded Age stand?" Fellowes replied, "It stands really with me up to my neck in research, and I'm clearing the decks, so that when I start Gilded Age, I'm only doing Gilded Age. These people were extraordinary. You can see why they frightened the old guard, because they saw no boundaries. They wanted to build a palace, they built a palace. They wanted to buy a yacht, they bought a yacht. And the old guard in New York weren't like that at all, and suddenly this whirlwind of couture descended on their heads. They redesigned being rich. They created a rich culture that we still have—people who are rich are rich in a way that was established in America in the 1880s, '90s, 1900s. It was different from Europe. Something like Newport would never have happened in any other country, where you have huge palaces, and then about 20 yards away, another huge palace, and 20 yards beyond that another huge palace. In England right up to the 1930s, when people made good money, they would buy an estate of 5,000 acres and they'd have to look after Nanny. The Americans of the 1880s and '90s didn't want too much of that."

The final confirmation the show would be produced was announced by NBC in January 2018. NBC originally announced that the show would consist of ten episodes and premiere in 2019. About the show, Fellowes stated: "To write The Gilded Age is the fulfillment of a personal dream, I have been fascinated by this period of American history for many years and now NBC has given me the chance to bring it to a modern audience. I could not be more excited and thrilled. The truth is, America is a wonderful country with a rich and varied history, and nothing could give me more pleasure than be the person to bring that compelling history to the screen."

In May 2019, the series moved from NBC to HBO, with a straight to series order. The series premiered on January 24, 2022, and consists of nine episodes.

On February 14, 2022, HBO renewed the series for a second season.

Casting
In September 2019, the production announced an initial cast consisting of Christine Baranski, Cynthia Nixon, Amanda Peet, and Morgan Spector.

In November 2019, it was announced that Denée Benton, Louisa Jacobson, Taissa Farmiga, Blake Ritson, and Simon Jones would be joining the show. In January 2020, Harry Richardson, Thomas Cocquerel, and Jack Gilpin were cast as series regulars, with Jeanne Tripplehorn cast in a recurring role.

In April Carrie Coon was cast as Bertha Russell to replace Peet because of delays caused by the COVID-19 pandemic. This caused the costuming team to change their approach, using the way Coon presents herself as inspiration for more metallic-colored dresses intended to evoke the burgeoning machine age.

In January 2021, Nathan Lane joined the cast in a recurring role.

In April 2022, it was announced several members of the recurring cast had been upgraded to series regular status for the second season while Cocquerel will exit the series.

Filming
Following the move to HBO, the series was expected to begin filming in March 2020, before the COVID-19 pandemic delayed production.

Filming of the series began in Newport, Rhode Island in February 2021, at the mansions Chateau-sur-Mer, The Elms, and The Breakers. A casting call for Rhode Islanders to work as extras on the series was made in December 2020 prior to the production setting up in the city.

In April 2021, filming continued at Lyndhurst Mansion in Tarrytown, NY and the Hudson River Museum in Yonkers, New York. In May 2021, filming continued in Troy, New York in its Central Troy Historic District where multiple city blocks were transformed to resemble a Victorian era street.

During filming, a horse died on set and People for the Ethical Treatment of Animals asked for an investigation. HBO subsequently issued a statement confirming the death in late June, saying, "a horse collapsed and died, likely of natural causes, according to a veterinarian’s preliminary findings."

Filming for season two began in August, 2022. Filming for season two has taken place at various locations around White Plains, NY, including Manhattanville College's Reid Hall. Reid Hall has been used as various sets including offices, a home parlor and an art gallery/museum. Reid Hall was designed by Stanford White and built in 1892 for the family of newspaper publisher and diplomat, Whitelaw Reid. Reid Castle was added to the National Register of Historic Places in 1972.

Controversy
On May 21, 2021, the American Federation of Musicians of the United States and Canada (AFM) filed a charge for unfair labor practices against HBO and its Gilded Age production. The union claimed musicians were fired after asking they be represented by AFM. Two days later HBO agreed to cover the members "on an AFM basis".

Real-life events
Although The Gilded Age is a work of fiction, Julian Fellowes worked to accurately represent certain realities of the time period. 

Caroline Schermerhorn Astor, also known as "The" Mrs. Astor, ruled New York society in the late nineteenth century. Descending from Dutch settlers, the "knickerbocker" married relatively new money William Backhouse Astor Jr. At the time the series takes place, Astor (Donna Murphy) and her husband are largely estranged. Dismayed by the chaos caused by the end of the Civil War and the rise of new money, and armed with her own distinguished lineage and her husband's fortune, she became the gatekeeper to high society. She and her associate Ward McAllister (Nathan Lane) decreed that members of respectable society must be separated by at least three generations from the origin of the family fortune, as she herself was. McAllister, Mrs. Astor's right-hand man, spent years across the Atlantic absorbing culture, details of European courts, and society news. Although some recognized his devotion to preserving elegance and tradition, others saw him as an unapologetic snob.

Two characters, Bertha and George Russell (Carrie Coon and Morgan Spector), appear to be at least partly based on the formidable Alva and William K. Vanderbilt. Alva Esrkine Vanderbilt (later Alva Belmont) came from a wealthy Mobile, Alabama family that lost its money after the Civil War. Determined to regain her social status, she married a scion of the immensely wealthy Vanderbilt family in 1875. But the Vanderbilts were considered too "new money" by Caroline Astor and were largely ignored.

Determined to ascend to the upper echelons of society, Alva Vanderbilt set out to impress Caroline Astor. Among her strategies, she hired society architect Richard Morris Hunt to build a luxurious mansion on Fifth Avenue, then hosted an enormous, extravagant ball for 1,000 as a ‘house-warming’. All details of the festivities were leaked in advance to the press, and young society waited breathlessly for the upcoming ball — including Caroline Astor’s daughter, Carrie (Amy Forsyth). Caroline Astor was forced to call on Alva Vanderbilt to ensure her daughter received an invitation. The ball a success, the family was officially welcomed into New York high society.

If Bertha Russel is modeled on Alva Vanderbilt, her husband, George Russell, bears little similarity to his counterpart, William K. Vanderbilt. He seems to be inspired by Vanderbilt only on the basis of wealth and marriage to an Alva-like wife.

Other historical figures who appear in the series include Clara Barton (Linda Emond), founder of the American Red Cross, and T. Thomas Fortune (Sullivan Jones), a man born into slavery who would become one of the leading Black journalists of his day. In his editorials, he wrote passionately about civil rights and denounced racial segregation and discrimination. He also helped found a predecessor to the NAACP, the Afro-American League.

Release
The series premiered on January 24, 2022, on HBO and HBO Max.

Home media
The first season was released on DVD, on July 26, 2022.

Reception

Critical response

At review aggregator website Rotten Tomatoes, the series holds a "Certified Fresh" 80% approval rating based on 70 reviews, with an average rating of 7.0/10. The site's critical consensus reads: "Julian Fellowes' brand of upstairs, downstairs intrigue makes a seamless transatlantic transition in The Gilded Age, with an outstanding cast making the travails of the rich a compelling watch". At Metacritic, the series has a score of 68 out of 100, based on 38 reviews, indicating "generally favorable reviews".

Awards and nominations

Ratings

Notes

References

External links
 
 

2020s American drama television series
2022 American television series debuts
Gilded Age
Costume drama television series
Serial drama television series
English-language television shows
Mass media portrayals of the upper class
Television controversies in the United States
Television series set in the 1880s
Television shows set in New York City
Television shows filmed in New York (state)
Television shows filmed in Rhode Island
HBO original programming
Primetime Emmy Award-winning television series
Television series by Home Box Office
Television series by Universal Television
Television series created by Julian Fellowes